Richard G. Sneed is the 28th Principal Chief of the Eastern Band of Cherokee Indians. Sneed succeeded former Principal Chief Patrick Lambert following Lambert's impeachment, only the second such impeachment since the 19th century.

Personal life 
Richard Sneed is a graduate of Cherokee High School in Cherokee, North Carolina. His family is from the Wolfetown Community of the Qualla Boundary. Sneed is a veteran of the United States Marine Corps, and a graduate of Universal Technical Institute in Phoenix, Arizona, and Southwestern Community College in Sylva, North Carolina. He holds a North Carolina teaching license in industrial arts. Sneed taught vocational classes at Cherokee High School where he was recognized as National Classroom Teacher of the Year by the National Indian Education Association. Sneed has also served as the senior pastor of the Christ Fellowship Church of Cherokee. Sneed and his ex-wife Trina resided in the Birdtown Community of the Qualla Boundary where they raised their five children.

Appointment 
Sneed began his services as an elected tribal leader for the tribe after winning election as principal vice-chief in September 2015 and assumed office in October 2015. Formerly, Patrick Lambert was serving as the 27th Principal Chief but Sneed began service as principal chief on in May 2017 after his predecessor was impeached and removed by the Eastern Band of Cherokee Indians Tribal Council.  In September 2017, Yellowhill Tribal Council member Alan B. Ensley assumed the principal vice-chief title left vacant after Sneed became Principal Chief. Speaking to WLOS in 2017, Sneed most recently called for community "healing" following Lambert's removal. Sneed was re-elected as Principal Chief in 2019 to a four year term, set to expire in 2023.

References 

1967 births
Living people
Tribal chiefs
Principal Chiefs of the Eastern Band of Cherokee Indians
20th-century Native Americans
21st-century Native Americans